2-Bromoanisole is an organobromide with the formula BrC6H4OCH3.  A colorless liquid, it is one of three isomers of bromoanisole, the others being 3-bromoanisole and 4-bromoanisole. It is a standard coupling partner in metal catalyzed coupling reactions.  These reactions include Heck reactions, Buchwald-Hartwig coupling, Suzuki couplings, and Ullmann condensations.  The corresponding Grignard reagent readily forms.  It is a precursor to o-anisaldehyde.

References

Phenol ethers
Bromoarenes